The Guarani River is a river of Paraná state in southern Brazil.

See also
List of rivers of Paraná

References

Brazilian Ministry of Transport

Rivers of Paraná (state)